Mohammad Fadel is a Professor and Toronto Research Chair for the Law and Economics of Islamic Law at the University of Toronto Faculty of Law. He is a member in the board of directors of NAML and Muslim Advocates. He researches Sharia.

References

21st-century Muslim scholars of Islam
Living people
Canadian legal scholars
American people of Egyptian descent
Academic staff of the University of Toronto Faculty of Law
Year of birth missing (living people)
American Muslims